Gallhuber is a surname. Notable people with the surname include: 

Katharina Gallhuber (born 1997), Austrian skier
Philipp Gallhuber (born 1995), Austrian footballer